Zoviyeh-ye Yek may refer to:
 Zoviyeh-ye Yek-e Olya
 Zoviyeh-ye Yek-e Sofla